Pseudozioidea is a superfamily of crabs, formerly treated in the Eriphioidea, Carpilioidea, Xanthoidea, Pilumnoidea and Goneplacoidea. A number of fossils from the Eocene onwards are known from the family Pseudoziidae. Eleven genera are recognised in three families:
Christmaplacidae Naruse & Ng, 2014
Christmaplax Naruse & Ng, 2014
Harryplax  Mendoza & Ng, 2017
Pilumnoididae Guinot & Macpherson, 1987
Pilumnoides Lucas, 1844
Setozius Ng & Ahyong, 2013
Planopilumnidae Serène, 1984
Haemocinus Ng, 2003
Planopilumnus Balss, 1933
Platychelonion Crosnier & Guinot, 1969
Pseudoziidae Alcock, 1898
Archaeozius † Schweitzer, 2003
Euryozius Miers, 1886
Flindersoplax Davie, 1989
Priabonocarcinus † Müller & Collins, 1991
Pseudozius Dana, 1851
Santeexanthus † Blow & Manning, 1996
Tongapapaka † Feldmann, Schweitzer & McLaughlin, 2006

References

Crabs
Extant Eocene first appearances
Decapod families